Luz Aída Duarte Moroyoqui (born 29 August 1995) is a Mexican professional footballer who plays as a forward for Liga MX Femenil side Club Universidad Nacional.

External links 
 

1995 births
Living people
Mexican women's footballers
Mexico women's international footballers
Women's association football forwards
LGBT association football players
Mexican LGBT sportspeople
Lesbian sportswomen